Jens August Jensen (2 May 1865 – 16 November 1936) was an Australian politician who served in the House of Representatives from 1910 to 1919. He was a minister in the governments of Andrew Fisher and Billy Hughes, serving as Minister for the Navy from 1915 to 1917 and Minister for Trade and Customs from 1917 to 1918.

Early life
Jensen was born on 2 May 1865 in Sebastopol, Victoria, on the outskirts of Ballarat. His Danish parents Anna Marie Christine and Anthon Jensen had immigrated to Australia during the Victorian gold rush; he was their third son. Jensen attended state schools until the age of 11, when he began working as a stable boy. He moved to Beaconsfield, Tasmania, in 1878 and worked as a rabbit hawker and miner; he eventually gained his engine driver's certificate. In 1885, Jensen married Elizabeth Frances Broadhurst. The couple had one son and four daughters before her death in 1894. He remarried in 1896 to Bertha Hopton, with whom he had another son and daughter. Also in 1896, Jensen built a hotel and theatre in Beaconsfield. He later opened a larger establishment at Beauty Point, and bought an orchard nearby. He was elected to the Beaconsfield Town Council in 1899.

Political career

In 1903 Jensen was elected as the member for George Town in the Tasmanian House of Assembly as an independent and was re-elected as a Labor candidate for George Town in 1906 and Wilmot 1909 and was Chief Secretary in a Labor government for eight days in October 1909.

In February 1910 he resigned from the House of Assembly and won the seat of Bass in the House of Representatives at the April 1910 election.  He served as an Assistant Minister and then in July 1915 he became the first Minister for the Navy in the Fisher and Hughes governments.  When a group of pro-conscription ALP members under Billy Hughes broke away in the 1916 Labor split to form the National Labor Party, Jensen joined them. Hughes retained government after the split, and Jensen was appointed Minister for Trade and Customs.  Along with the other members of National Labor, Jensen joined the Commonwealth Liberal Party in forming the Nationalist Party of Australia.  In 1918, Jensen was investigated by the Royal Commission on Navy and Defence Administration. When the Commission found against him, he was forced to resign from the ministry. He subsequently lost his endorsement to contest his seat at the 1919 election. Though he attempted to contest the seat as an independent, he was defeated by the endorsed Nationalist candidate, Syd Jackson.

Jensen subsequently shifted to state politics, elected to the Tasmanian House of Assembly seat of Bass in 1922. After losing his seat in 1925, he rejoined the ALP in 1927, and was elected for Wilmot, holding it until 1934.

Personal life
Jensen at times treated his wife violently and for the last 37 years of his life kept his cousin, Maggie Jane Gilbert as his mistress and gave her almost all of his wealth.  He died of a stroke in the Melbourne suburb of South Caulfield, Victoria, survived by his wife and their son and daughter.  He left no money to them or the children of his first marriage.

References

1865 births
1936 deaths
Australian people of Danish descent
Australian Labor Party members of the Parliament of Australia
Independent members of the Parliament of Australia
Nationalist Party of Australia members of the Parliament of Australia
Members of the Australian House of Representatives for Bass
Members of the Australian House of Representatives
Members of the Cabinet of Australia
Members of the Tasmanian House of Assembly
National Labor Party members of the Parliament of Australia
Australian Labor Party members of the Parliament of Tasmania
Independent members of the Parliament of Tasmania
20th-century Australian politicians
People from Ballarat
Tasmanian local councillors